Meloinae is a subfamily of beetles in the family Meloidae. There are at least 330 described species in Meloinae.

Genera
 Cordylospasta Horn, 1875
 Cysteodemus LeConte, 1851 (desert spider beetles)
 Epicauta Dejean, 1834
 Eupompha LeConte, 1858
 Linsleya MacSwain, 1951
 Lytta Fabricius, 1775
 Megetra LeConte, 1859
 Meloe Linnaeus, 1758 (oil beetles)
 Phodaga LeConte, 1858
 Pleuropasta Wellman, 1909
 Pyrota Dejean, 1834
 Spastonyx Selander, 1954
 Tegrodera LeConte, 1851 (iron cross blister beetles)

References

 Lawrence, J. F., and A. F. Newton Jr. / Pakaluk, James, and Stanislaw Adam Slipinski, eds. (1995). "Families and subfamilies of Coleoptera (with selected genera, notes, references and data on family-group names)". Biology, Phylogeny, and Classification of Coleoptera: Papers Celebrating the 80th Birthday of Roy A. Crowson, vol. 2, 779–1006.
 Pinto, J. D., and M. A. Bologna (1999). "The New World genera of Meloidae (Coleoptera): a key and synopsis". Journal of Natural History, vol. 33, no. 4, 569–620.
 Pinto, John D., and Marco A. Bologna (2002). "Family 111. Meloidae Gyllenhal 1810". American Beetles, vol. 2: Polyphaga: Scarabaeoidea through Curculionoidea, 522–529.

Further reading

 Arnett, R. H. Jr., M. C. Thomas, P. E. Skelley and J. H. Frank. (eds.). (21 June 2002). American Beetles, Volume II: Polyphaga: Scarabaeoidea through Curculionoidea. CRC Press LLC, Boca Raton, Florida .
 
 Richard E. White. (1983). Peterson Field Guides: Beetles. Houghton Mifflin Company.

Meloidae
Polyphaga subfamilies